Alex Shvartsman (born 1975) is an American science fiction and fantasy writer and editor known primarily for humorous short stories. He won the WSFA Small Press Award for Short Fiction in 2014 for his short story "Explaining Cthulhu to Grandma" published in the InterGalactic Medicine Show magazine. He won the WSFA Small Press Award in 2014 and was a finalist for the Canopus Award for Excellence in Interstellar Writing in 2015 and 2017.

Alex Shvartsman is also a Magic: The Gathering player. While having enjoyed only a moderate degree of success on the Pro Tour, he is one of the most successful Grand Prix players ever. With 21 appearances, Shvartsman held the record for most Grand Prix top eights for a long time, but is now ranked 12th tied with Shota Yasooka.

Bibliography

Full-length books

 Explaining Cthulhu to Grandma and Other Stories, UFO Publishing, 2015
 H. G. Wells, Secret Agent, UFO Publishing, 2015
 The Golem of Deneb Seven and Other Stories, UFO Publishing, 2018
Eridani's Crown, UFO Publishing, 2019
 The Middling Affliction, Caezik SF & Fantasy, 2022

Selected short stories

 "How Gaia and the Guardian Saved the World", Amazing Stories, 2016
 "One in a Million", On Spec, 2016
 "Whom He May Devour", Nautilus, 2016
 "Islands in the Sargasso", Galaxy's Edge, 2015
 "Burying Treasure", Chicks and Balances (Baen Books), 2015
 "He Who Watches", Fireside, 2015
 "The Golem of Deneb Seven", InterGalactic Medicine Show, 2014
 "The Keepsake Box", Daily Science Fiction, 2014
 "High-Tech Fairies and the Pandora Perplexity", InterGalactic Medicine Show, 2014
 "In the Wake of the Storm", Buzzy Magazine, 2013
 "The Rumination on What Isn't", Nature, 2013
 "The Tinker Bell Problem", Buzzy Magazine, 2013
 "Things We Leave Behind", Daily Science Fiction, 2013
 "Explaining Cthulhu to Grandma", InterGalactic Medicine Show, 2013
 "The Epistolary History", Nature, 2013
 "A Gnomish Gift", Weird Tales, 2013
 "Requiem for a Druid", Galaxy's Edge, 2013
 "The Miracle on Tau Prime", Daily Science Fiction, 2013
 "The Tell-Tale Ear", Nature, 2012
 "Nuclear Family", Kasma SF, 2012
 "Ravages of Time", Nature, 2012
 "A Shard Glows in Brooklyn", Buzzy Magazine 2012
 "The Take", Daily Science Fiction, 2012
 "Spidersong", Daily Science Fiction, 2011
 Link to complete bibliography.

As editor
 "Unidentified Funny Objects: An Anthology of Science Fiction & Fantasy Humor". United States: UFO Publishing, 2012.
 "Unidentified Funny Objects 2". United States: UFO Publishing, 2013.
 "Coffee: 14 Caffeinated Tales of the Fantastic". United States: UFO Publishing, 2013.
 "Dark Expanse: Surviving the Collapse". United States: Deorc Enterprise, 2014.
 "Unidentified Funny Objects 3". United States: UFO Publishing, 2014.
 "Funny Science Fiction". United States: UFO Publishing, 2015.
 "Unidentified Funny Objects 4". United States: UFO Publishing, 2015.
 "Funny Fantasy". United States: UFO Publishing, 2016.
 "Unidentified Funny Objects 5". United States: UFO Publishing, 2016.
 "Humanity 2.0". United States: Arc Manor / Phoenix Pick, 2016.
 "Funny Horror". United States: UFO Publishing, 2017.
 "Unidentified Funny Objects 6". United States: UFO Publishing, 2017.
 "The Cackle of Cthulhu". United States: Baen Books, 2018.
"Unidentified Funny Objects 7." United States: UFO Publishing, 2018.

Magic: The Gathering achievements

References

External links
 Alex Shvartsman's home page

Living people
American science fiction writers
Science fiction editors
American Magic: The Gathering players
Writers from Brooklyn
1975 births
American male short story writers
21st-century American short story writers
21st-century American male writers
Writers from Odesa
Ukrainian emigrants to the United States